The COVID-19 pandemic in Burkina Faso is part of the ongoing worldwide pandemic of coronavirus disease 2019 caused by severe acute respiratory syndrome coronavirus 2. The virus was confirmed to have reached Burkina Faso on 9 March 2020. The death of Rose Marie Compaoré, a member of the National Assembly of Burkina Faso, on 18 March marked the first recorded fatality due to COVID-19 in Sub-Saharan Africa.



Background 
On 12 January 2020, the World Health Organization (WHO) confirmed that a novel coronavirus was the cause of a respiratory illness in a cluster of people in Wuhan City, Hubei Province, China, which was reported to the WHO on 31 December 2019. The case fatality ratio for COVID-19 has been much lower than SARS of 2003, but the transmission has been significantly greater, with a significant total death toll. Model-based simulations for Burkina Faso indicate that the 95% confidence interval for the time-varying reproduction number R t fluctuated around 1 in 2021 before rising to around 2 in 2022.

Water shortages are a particular challenge in Burkina Faso. Burkina Faso's coronavirus curfew stopped those in poor areas from accessing communal fountains that only flow at night in the dry season. A lack of water also makes washing hands and general hygiene difficult. In the past year, armed groups have devastated villages in the north and east of Burkina Faso, leaving more than 800,000 people displaced. They have fled to urban centers or sites designated for internally displaced people (IDPs), where overcrowding and lack of access to water are huge problems for families and host communities. Hygiene measures, such as frequent hand washing with soap and water, wearing a mask, and social distancing don't translate into reality for displaced people. In June 2020, slam poet Malika Ouattara focussed the work of her charity, the Slamazone Foundation to promote good hygiene in the face of the pandemic.

Approximately 350,000 people in Burkina Faso urgently need access to sufficient water and shelter facilities to aid them in coping desert-like conditions faced in the isolated parts of Burkina Faso. The UN Refugee Agency warned of more lives to possibly fall at risk in the Burkina Faso Centre Nord and Sahel regions. These places have been pointed out as they shelter hundreds of people displaced from their homes, including small children.

Timeline

March 2020
 On 9 March 2020, the first two cases in the country were reported in Burkina Faso.
 On 13 March, the third case was also confirmed: a person who had had direct contact with the first two cases.
 On 14 March, 7 cases confirmed in the country. Five of the new confirmed cases had had direct contact with the first two cases. One is an English national currently working in a gold mine in Burkina Faso and who went to vacation in Liverpool, returning on 10 March, with transits through Vancouver and Paris.
 On 15 March, 8 new cases were confirmed according to a statement from the Ministry of Health, bringing the total number of cases to 15.
 On 17 March, 20 total cases were confirmed.
 On 18 March, the first fatality was confirmed, Rose Marie Compaoré, a 61-year-old woman with a preexisting diabetic condition.
 On 18 March, 27 total cases were confirmed.
 On 19 March, 33 total cases were confirmed by the Burkina Faso Ministry of Health.
 On 20 March, 40 total cases were confirmed. President Roch Marc Christian Kabore closed airports, land borders and imposed a nationwide curfew to curb the spread of the pandemic. Burkina Faso's Education Minister Stanislas Ouaro said he had tested positive for the coronavirus.
 On 21 March, 64 total cases and 3 deaths were confirmed. Minister of Mines and Quarries, Oumarou Idani, tested positive for COVID-19 after returning from a conference in Toronto, Canada.
 On 22 March, 75 total confirmed cases. Four key government ministers are confirmed to be infected, these ministers are: Alpha Barry, Minister of Foreign Affairs; Oumarou Idani, Minister of Mines and Quarries; Stanislas Ouaro, Minister of Education; and Simeon Sawadogo, Minister of Interior. Five cases, including the original couple, have recovered. The U.S. Ambassador to Burkina Faso, Andrew Robert Young, tested positive. Five deaths have been confirmed.
 On 23 March, the Burkina Faso Ministry of Health confirmed 100 cases of COVID-19 in Burkina Faso. The U.S. Embassy has begun to repatriate citizens to the United States. Harouna Kaboré, the Minister of Trade, tested positive for coronavirus.
 On March 24, the Burkina Faso Ministry of Health confirmed 114 cases of COVID-19 in Burkina Faso, 89 in Ouagadougou, 4 in Bobo-Dioulasso, 2 in Dedougou, 2 in Boromo, and 1 in Houndé.
 On March 30, with 12 deaths, Burkina Faso has the most fatalities in sub-Saharan Africa. Burkina Faso has just one hospital currently configured to receive coronavirus patients, and it only has a handful of ventilators. At least six government ministers have since tested positive for the virus, as have two foreign ambassadors, from Italy and the United States. A single testing laboratory in Bobo-Dioulasso – a five-hour drive from the capital of Ouagdougou – means suspected cases all over the country have to wait at least 12 hours for results. The government said it wants to establish a second laboratory in Ouagadougou but has no one qualified to set up the equipment in the country. With borders sealed, the process of bringing in an outsider is being delayed.
 By the end March there had been 261 positive tests, 14 deaths and 32 recovered patients. There were 215 active cases at the end of the month.

April to December 2020
 There were 384 new cases in April, 202 in May, 115 in June, 176 in July, 232 in August, 658 in September, 472 in October, 386 in November, and 3,745 in December. The total number of cases stood at 645 in April, 847 in May, 962 in June, 1138 in July, 1370 in August, 2028 in September, 2500 in October, 2886 in November, and 6,631 in December.
 The number of recovered patients increased to 506 in April, 720 in May, 838 in June, 967 in July, 1279 in September, 2250 in October, 2593 in November, and 4,978 in December, leaving 96 active cases at the end of April, 74 at the end of May, 71 at the end of June, 118 at the end of July, 255 at the end of August, 692 at the end of September, 183 at the end of October, 225 at the end of November, and 1569 at the end of December.
 The death toll rose to 43 in April, 53 in May, 55 in August, 57 in September, 67 in October, 68 in November, and 84 in December.

January to December 2021

 There were 4051 new cases in January, 1300 in February, 735 in March, 592 in April, 121 in May, 49 in June, 109 in July, 189 in August, 485 in September, 531 in October, 1207 in November, and 1632 in December. The total number of cases stood at 10,682 in January, 11,982 in February, 12,717 in March, 13,309 in April, 13,430 in May, 13,479 in June, 13,588 in July, 13,777 in August, 14,262 in September, 14,793 in October, 16,000 in November, and 17,632 in December.
 The number of recovered patients was 9,253 in January, 11,493 in February, 12,385 in March, 13,031 in April, 13,248 in May, 13,301 in June, 13,380 in July, 13,535 in August, 13,892 in September, 14,287 in October, 15,345 in November, and 16,619 in December, leaving 1309 active cases at the end of January, 346 at the end of February, 186 at the end of March, 121 at the end of April, 16 at the end of May, 10 at the end of June, 39 at the end of July, 71 at the end of August, 186 at the end of September, 292 at the end of October, 369 at the end of November, and 695 at the end of December.
 The death toll rose to 120 in January, 143 in February, 146 in March, 157 in April, 166 in May, 168 in June, 169 in July, 171 in August, 184 in September, 214 in October, 286 in November, and 318 in December.
 Modeling carried out by the WHO’s Regional Office for Africa suggests that due to under-reporting, the true cumulative number of infections by the end of 2021 was around 9.2 million while the true number of COVID-19 deaths was around 6,750.
 Burkina Faso's first two cases of the omicron variant were confirmed on 17 December.

January to December 2022
 There were 3017 new cases in January, 102 in February, 107 in March, 7 in April, 179 in May, 84 in July, 76 in August, 427 in September, and 375 in December. The total number of cases stood at 20,649 in January, 20,751 in February, 20,858 in March, 20,865 in April, 21,044 in May, 21,128 in July, 21,204 in August, 21,631 in September, and 22,006 in December.
 The number of recovered patients was 20,153 in January, 20,309 in February, 20,446 in March, 20,471 in April, 20,497 in May, and 21,596 in December, leaving 125 active cases at the end of January, 67 in February, 30 at the end of March, 11 at the end of April, 160 at the end of May, and 15 at the end of December.
 The death toll rose to 371 in January, 375 in February, 382 in March, 383 in April, 387 in May, and 395 in December.

January to December 2023
 There were 19 new cases in January. The total number of cases was 22,025 in January.
 The number of recovered patients stood at 21,596 in January, leaving 33 active cases at the end of January.
 The death toll rose to 396 in January.

Statistics

Confirmed new cases per day

Confirmed deaths per day

See also 
 COVID-19 vaccination in Burkina Faso
 COVID-19 pandemic in Africa
 COVID-19 pandemic by country and territory
 2020 in West Africa

References

External links
 Burkina Faso: Escalating Conflict Is Fueling a Humanitarian Crisis in Eastern Burkina Faso
 Africa Centres for Disease Control and Prevention (CDC) Dashboard on Covid-19 
 COVID-19 Africa Open Data Project Dashboard
 West African Health Organization COVID-19 Dashboard
 WHO COVID-19 Dashboard

 
Burkina Faso
Burkina Faso
COVID-19 pandemic
COVID-19 pandemic
Disease outbreaks in Burkina Faso
2021 disasters in Burkina Faso 
2020 disasters in Burkina Faso